Dallas Zoo is a DART Light Rail station located in the Oak Cliff neighborhood of Dallas, Texas (USA) at Ewing Avenue and Clarendon Drive.

References

External links
 DART - Dallas Zoo Station

Dallas Area Rapid Transit light rail stations in Dallas
Railway stations in the United States opened in 1996
1996 establishments in Texas
Railway stations in Dallas County, Texas